Susanna Wilkerson Dickinson (1813 – October 7, 1883) and her infant daughter, Angelina, were among the few American survivors of 1836 Battle of the Alamo during the Texas Revolution. Her husband, Almaron Dickinson, and 185 other Texian defenders were killed by the Mexican Army.

Early life 
In Tennessee's Williamson County, Susanna was born in 1813, yet she never learned to read or write. She married Almaron Dickinson on May 24, 1829, when she was only 15 years old. After acquiring land along the San Marcos River, they became DeWitt Colonists two years later. They then constructed a blacksmith shop there and made investments in fellow colonist George Kimbell's Gonzales hat business.

Texas Revolution
As the Mexican government increasingly abandoned its federalist structure in favor of a more centralized government, Almaron Dickinson became one of the early proponents of war. He would later join with other volunteers during the Battle of Gonzales, becoming one of the "Old Gonzales 18" in the battle which launched the Texas Revolution on October 2, 1835. By the end of the year, the Texian army had driven all Mexican soldiers from the territory. Soon after, Susanna joined Almaron at the former Alamo Mission in San Antonio de Bexar (now San Antonio, Texas) shortly after his assignment to the garrison there. The Dickinson family lived outside the Alamo, boarding with the Ruiz family.

In early 1836, Mexican President Antonio Lopez de Santa Anna led troops into Texas, which arrived in San Antonio on February 23 and immediately besieged the Alamo. It did not even have food stocked inside the mission to withstand the siege. The men thus quickly herded cattle into it and scrounged for food in the recently abandoned houses outside. Susanna and Angelina were among the families of garrison members who were brought inside for safety.

For the next twelve days, the Alamo lay under siege. Santa Anna planned an early morning assault for March 6. At 8:10 pm on March 5 the Mexican artillery ceased their bombardment. As Santa Anna had planned, the exhausted Texans soon fell into the first uninterrupted sleep many had had since the siege began. At 5:30 am Santa Anna gave the order to advance. As the Mexican soldiers began to yell and their buglers sounded, the Texan defenders awakened and rushed to their posts. Susanna, Angelina, and most other noncombatants gathered in the chapel sacristy for safety. She later mentioned that Davy Crockett stopped briefly to pray before taking his assigned position.

The Mexican soldiers soon breached the Alamo's outer walls. As previously planned, most of the Texians fell back to the barracks and the chapel. Almaron Dickinson briefly slipped from his post manning a cannon in the chapel to join Susanna in the sacristy. He yelled "Great God, Sue, the Mexicans are inside our walls! If they spare you, save my child!", then kissed her and returned to his cannon. It took an hour for the Mexican army to secure complete control of the Alamo. Among the last Texians to die were the 11 men, including Almaron, manning the two 12-pounder cannon in the chapel.  The entrance had been barricaded with sandbags, which the Texans were able to fire over. However, a shot from the Mexican 18-pounder cannon destroyed the barricade, and Mexican soldiers entered after an initial musket volley. Although Dickinson's crew fired their cannon from the apse into the Mexican soldiers, they had no time to reload. Dickinson, Gregorio Esparza, Bonham, and the remaining Texians grabbed rifles and fired before being bayoneted to death. Texian Robert Evans, the master of ordnance, had been tasked with keeping the gunpowder from falling into Mexican hands. Wounded, he crawled towards the powder magazine but was killed by a musket ball with his torch only inches from the powder. If he had succeeded, the blast would have destroyed the chapel, killing Susanna and the other women and children hiding in it.
As soldiers approached the sacristy, one of defender Anthony Wolf's sons stood to pull a blanket over his shoulders and was killed. Possibly the last Texian to die in battle was Jacob Walker, who attempted to hide behind Susanna and the other women; four Mexican soldiers killed him in front of them. Another Texian, Brigido Guerrero, who had deserted from the Mexican Army in December 1835 also sought refuge in the sacristy, and was spared after convincing the soldiers he was a prisoner of the Texians.  In the confusion, Susanna was lightly wounded.

On March 7, Santa Anna interviewed each of the survivors individually. Impressed with Susanna, he offered to adopt Angelina and have her educated in Mexico City. Susanna refused, which was not extended to fellow Alamo survivor Juana Navarro Alsbury for her son of similar age.

Santa Anna ordered that the Tejano civilian survivors be allowed to return to their homes in San Antonio. Susanna and Joe, a Texian slave, were allowed to travel towards the Anglo settlements, escorted by Ben, a former American slave who served as Mexican Colonel Juan Almonte's cook. Each woman received $2 and a blanket and was allowed to go free and spread the news of the destruction that awaited those who opposed the Mexican government. Before they departed, Santa Anna ordered that the surviving members of the Mexican army parade in a grand review, intending that Joe and Susanna would thus warn the remainder of the Texian forces that his army was unbeatable.

When the small party of survivors arrived in Gonzales on March 13, they found Sam Houston, the commander of all Texian forces, waiting there with about 400 men. After Susanna and Joe related the details of the battle and the strength of Santa Anna's army, Houston advised all civilians to evacuate and then ordered the army to retreat. Thus began the Runaway Scrape, in which much of Texas' population, including the acting government, rushed eastward to escape the advancing Mexican army.

Susanna's witness accounts

Susanna reported, after the battle, the following about the siege and final fight:

 There were very few casualties before the final assault. She did not know the number.
 She confirmed the legendary "line in the sand" incident, where William Barrett Travis gave defenders the choice of staying or leaving, did happen. However, she said that it happened the day before the final assault, when it is believed to have happened on either March 3 or March 4.
 On the morning of the assault, Almaron ran into where she had hidden, made his final statements to her and revealed that the Mexicans were inside, then returned to his duty. She never saw him again, nor did she ever see his body.
 She hid inside the chapel, and did not see the actual battle. One defender ran inside during the battle, attempting to hide, but was killed by Mexican soldiers.
 When she was discovered, a Mexican officer intervened. She believed he was a British mercenary named either Black or Almonte. He actually was Juan Almonte, who spoke perfect English, having been educated in New Orleans.
 Outside there was a single survivor, found hiding, who unsuccessfully begged for mercy and was killed. Joe also reported this, claiming the man's name was Warner. However, no Warner is listed as being at the Alamo. The most similar name is Henry Warnell, who departed the Alamo as a courier, probably on February 28, 1836, and died in Port Lavaca, Texas, of wounds received either during the battle or his escape in June 1836.
 She saw the body of Davy Crockett between the chapel and the barracks building. This recollection of Crockett's death stands in direct conflict with the Jesús Sánchez Garza - José Enrique de la Peña account.
 She was taken to a house where she'd previously lived, and from there could see the pyres of the dead being burned.
 The next day she was taken before Santa Anna, and Almonte, or Black, convinced Santa Anna to release her rather than imprison her.
 She was sent east with Joe, and on the way to Gonzales, she was intercepted by a party including Deaf Smith.
 At some point after the battle, she had no recollections, only that she wept for days.

Other survivors, including Enrique Esparza (the son of Alamo defender Gregorio Esparza) confirmed some of Suzanna's account.

Since Susanna was an intelligent and well-spoken woman, Santa Anna had her identify the bodies of all the commanders and main players.

After the Alamo

Illiterate, Susanna left no written accounts of what happened in the Alamo, but did give several similar oral accounts. She remarried soon afterward to a man named John Williams on Nov 27, 1837, but they divorced almost immediately afterward on the grounds of cruelty. She married a third time on Dec 20, 1838 to a man named Francis P. Herring, but he died of alcoholism in 1843. She married a fourth  time on Dec 7, 1847, to a man named Peter Belles, but they divorced in 1857, allegedly due to her having an affair. On Dec 9, 1857 she married a fifth and final time to a man named Joseph W. Hannig, a cabinet maker, and with whom she remained for the rest of her life.

Death and legacy

Susanna died in 1883 and was buried in Oakwood Cemetery in Austin, with the following inscription:

"Sacred to the Memory of Susan A. Wife of J. W. Hannig Died Oct. 7, 1883 Aged 68 Years."

Hannig lived long after Susanna (dying in 1890) and placed the original marble marker. The state of Texas added a marble slab above their graves on March 2, 1949. A cenotaph honoring Susanna was placed in the Texas State Cemetery in Austin.

The house Hannig built in Austin in 1869 became a museum, The Joseph and Susanna Dickinson Hannig Museum, dedicated to Susanna and the other Alamo survivors.

Susanna's daughter Angelina married at age 17, to a farmer supposedly hand-picked by her mother, but later the marriage ended in divorce. She then relocated to New Orleans, where a second marriage ended in divorce. She lived for a time in Galveston, with a man named Jim Britton, to whom she gave the ring given to her by Colonel Travis. She died at age 37, by then living under the name Emma Britton.

In film and other media
Susanna was portrayed by Joan O'Brien in the 1960 John Wayne feature film The Alamo.  She was featured in the dramatic final scene walking away from the fort and into the sunset with Angelina on the back of a mule, and a young slave boy walking with her. As she walks past Santa Anna she exchanges some very dramatic looks with him. Other important events dramatized in the film include her being captured in the chapel at bayonet point, and her electing to stay as Santa Anna allows the other women to leave the fort before the battle.

Kathleen York portrayed Susanna in the 1987 film The Alamo: 13 Days to Glory. After the battle, Col. Black (David Ogden Stiers) enters the room where the women and children are hiding and says that Santa Anna wishes to meet with her. After she refuses, he tells her that she should accept his invitation, that the lives of her children and comrades depend on it.

In the 2004 version of The Alamo, Laura Clifton portrays Susanna Dickinson. She has a fairly minor part in the film.  However, in the final battle scene she is shown witnessing Almaron's death, who a little earlier calls her by her name.  In almost every scene she is in, she is shown holding Angelina.

In 2015, Dickinson was portrayed by Alixandra von Renner, in the History Channel miniseries, Texas Rising.

See also
 List of Texan survivors of the Battle of the Alamo

Notes

References
 
 
 
 

 
 . Reprint. Originally published: New York: McGraw-Hill, 1958

External links
McArdle Collection Texas State Library and Archive
Susanna Dickinson at the Texas State Cemetery 
Joseph and Susanna Dickinson Museum

Women in warfare in North America
Women in 19th-century warfare
People of the Texas Revolution
Alamo survivors
People from Tennessee
1814 births
1883 deaths
Burials at Oakwood Cemetery (Austin, Texas)
People from Gonzales, Texas